The following lists events that happened during 1947 in Southern Rhodesia.

Incumbents
 Prime Minister: Godfrey Huggins

Events

Births
 February 23 - Godfrey Chidyausiku, politician and chief justice since 2001
 March 11 - Ian Robinson, cricket umpire
 October 23 - Miles Anderson, stage and television actor
 date unclear - Charles Mungoshi, writer

Deaths

 
Years of the 20th century in Southern Rhodesia
Zimbabwe
Zimbabwe, 1947 In